Chocolate Brown may refer to:

 Brown HT (also Chocolate Brown HT), a brown synthetic coal tar diazo dye
 Chocolate (color), a shade of brown
 "Chocolate Brown", a song from The Cranberries' 2001 album Wake Up and Smell the Coffee
 Irene Scruggs (1901–1981; also Chocolate Brown), American Piedmont blues and country blues singer

See also
 Chocolate brownie